Alaa Abdullah Hamoud Al Saadoun (born 1956), is an  Iraqi politician, member of the Transitional National Assembly (2004-2005) and the Council of Representatives for the governorate of Baghdad in its first session (2005-2010) for Iraqi Islamic Party inside the Iraqi Accord Front. She served as Chairman of the Finance Committee at that session and member of the Committee of the Drafting of the 2005 Constitution.

References

1956 births
Living people
Members of the Council of Representatives of Iraq
21st-century Iraqi women politicians
21st-century Iraqi politicians
People from Baghdad
Iraqi Islamic Party politicians
Iraqi Accord Front politicians